String Theory was an electronic music band from Chicago that existed from 1997 until 2005.  The members were Joshua R. Davison and Nathan T. Tucker.  Contemporaries included Casino vs Japan, Pulseprogramming, and Telefon Tel Aviv.

The two now work as the Thorny Tigers production team and are 2/3 of the band Parks & Gardens with Andy Duncan formerly of Ok Go.

Discography

Releases
SMAK 03/04 12" - Skam Records, 2001: double 12" with Made (band)
Anhedonia CD/LP - Consumer's Research and Development, 2002
Magic Arrows / String Theory FEW-005 7" - Frank Wobbly & Sons, 2004 
Radiovalerian CD/LP - Wobblyhead Records, 2004
Rubyray MP3 - Electrochelou Web Label, 2005

Remixes/Compilations
String Theory Meets Salvo Beta Uptown at Manzebel Retbeats (Remix for Salvo Beta) - Evil Against Evil CD and 12" 2002
Bloopalong, Tevatron, Jusaan - SMAK 2CD - Skam Records, 2002: CD of Smak 12" series
Stepp In/Out - Lumptronic 5: Lumpenwave - Lumpen Magazine, 2002
Ambulette - Select #4: Chicago School Select Media, 2002
Dregs (Miles Tilmann Remix) - Hazardous Materials CD Compilation - Consumers Research and Development 2005

References
Gapers Block: String Theory at Rodan
Boomkat: String Theory - Anhedonia
String Theory Discography
[ Allmusic: String Theory's Radiovalerian]

External links
String Theory Website

Electronic music groups from Illinois
Intelligent dance musicians
Musical groups from Chicago